Melling is a suburb of Lower Hutt, to the north of Wellington in the North Island of New Zealand. It is on the west bank of the Hutt River, on State Highway 2, the Wellington-Hutt main road, and directly across the river from the centre of Lower Hutt.  It is also the name of the three-lane bridge connecting the Hutt City central business district with State Highway 2, a route subject to extensive congestion at peak times.  From the Melling Bridge it is possible to drive straight ahead into the hill suburbs of Harbour View and Tirohanga.

Improved interchanges are planned for the Melling and Kennedy-Good bridges.

History
Melling was named after William Melling, a former Lancashire mentor of Richard Seddon in the foundry where he worked prior to leaving for New Zealand. Seddon and Melling remained in touch, with gifts of New Zealand lamb being sent to Melling at his home in St Helens at Christmas time. The name came about after then-Premier Seddon revisited England and his friend Melling in 1897. Melling had never visited New Zealand, and the local settlers intended to change the name to one of greater significance.

The original Melling railway station opened on 26 May 1908, while the Melling bridge opened in 1909.

Melling Line
The Melling Railway Station is the terminus of the Melling Line which provides a suburban commuter service to Wellington. This line was originally part of the Hutt Valley Line through to Upper Hutt and the Wairarapa, but became a separate (electrified) branch line on 1 March 1954, when the section north of Melling to Haywards (now Manor Park) was closed and replaced by a new double-tracked line on the eastern side of the Hutt River (the old Melling-Haywards section could not be double-tracked).

Demographics
Melling is included in the Alicetown-Melling statistical area.

External links
Statistics New Zealand - Melling Community Profile

References

Suburbs of Lower Hutt
Populated places on Te Awa Kairangi / Hutt River